

Events

Pre-1600
295 BC – The first temple to Venus, the Roman goddess of love, beauty and fertility, is dedicated by Quintus Fabius Maximus Gurges during the Third Samnite War.
43 BC – Gaius Julius Caesar Octavianus, later known as Augustus, compels the Roman Senate to elect him Consul.
 947 – Abu Yazid, a Kharijite rebel leader, is defeated and killed in the Hodna Mountains in modern-day Algeria by Fatimid forces.
1153 – Baldwin III of Jerusalem takes control of the Kingdom of Jerusalem from his mother Melisende, and also captures Ascalon.
1458 – Pope Pius II is elected the 211th Pope.
1504 – In Ireland, the Hiberno-Norman de Burghs (Burkes) and Anglo-Norman Fitzgeralds fight in the Battle of Knockdoe.
1561 – Mary, Queen of Scots, aged 18, returns to Scotland after spending 13 years in France.

1601–1900
1604 – Eighty Years War: a besieging Dutch and English army led by Maurice of Orange forces the Spanish garrison of Sluis to capitulate.
1612 – The "Samlesbury witches", three women from the Lancashire village of Samlesbury, England, are put on trial, accused of practicing witchcraft, one of the most famous witch trials in British history.
1666 – Second Anglo-Dutch War: Rear Admiral Robert Holmes leads a raid on the Dutch island of Terschelling, destroying 150 merchant ships, an act later known as "Holmes's Bonfire".
1692 – Salem witch trials: In Salem, Province of Massachusetts Bay, five people, one woman and four men, including a clergyman, are executed after being convicted of witchcraft.
1745 – Prince Charles Edward Stuart raises his standard in Glenfinnan: The start of the Second Jacobite Rebellion, known as "the 45".
  1745   – Ottoman–Persian War: In the Battle of Kars, the Ottoman army is routed by Persian forces led by Nader Shah.
1759 – Battle of Lagos: Naval battle during the Seven Years' War between Great Britain and France.
1772 – Gustav III of Sweden stages a coup d'état, in which he assumes power and enacts a new constitution that divides power between the Riksdag and the King.
1782 – American Revolutionary War: Battle of Blue Licks: The last major engagement of the war, almost ten months after the surrender of the British commander Charles Cornwallis following the Siege of Yorktown.
1813 – Gervasio Antonio de Posadas joins Argentina's Second Triumvirate.
1839 – The French government announces that Louis Daguerre's photographic process is a gift "free to the world".
1848 – California Gold Rush: The New York Herald breaks the news to the East Coast of the United States of the gold rush in California (although the rush started in January).
1854 – The First Sioux War begins when United States Army soldiers kill Lakota chief Conquering Bear and in return are massacred.
1861 – First ascent of Weisshorn, fifth highest summit in the Alps.
1862 – Dakota War: During an uprising in Minnesota, Lakota warriors decide not to attack heavily defended Fort Ridgely and instead turn to the settlement of New Ulm, killing white settlers along the way.

1901–present
1909 – The Indianapolis Motor Speedway opens for automobile racing. Wilfred Bourque and his mechanic are killed during the first day's events.
1920 – The Tambov Rebellion breaks out, in response to the Bolshevik policy of Prodrazvyorstka.
1927 – Patriarch Sergius of Moscow proclaims the declaration of loyalty of the Russian Orthodox Church to the Soviet Union.
1934 – The first All-American Soap Box Derby is held in Dayton, Ohio.
  1934   – The German referendum of 1934 approves Adolf Hitler's appointment as head of state with the title of Führer.
1936 – The Great Purge of the Soviet Union begins when the first of the Moscow Trials is convened.
1940 – First flight of the B-25 Mitchell medium bomber.
1941 – Germany and Romania sign the Tiraspol Agreement, rendering the region of Transnistria under control of the latter.
1942 – World War II: Operation Jubilee: The 2nd Canadian Infantry Division leads an amphibious assault by allied forces on Dieppe, France and fails, many Canadians are killed or captured. The operation was intended to develop and try new amphibious landing tactics for the coming full invasion in Normandy.
1944 – World War II: Liberation of Paris: Paris, France rises against German occupation with the help of Allied troops.
1945 – August Revolution: Viet Minh led by Ho Chi Minh take power in Hanoi, Vietnam.
1953 – Cold War: The CIA and MI6 help to overthrow the government of Mohammad Mosaddegh in Iran and reinstate the Shah Mohammad Reza Pahlavi.
1955 – In the Northeast United States, severe flooding caused by Hurricane Diane, claims 200 lives.
1960 – Cold War: In Moscow, Russia, Soviet Union, downed American U-2 pilot Francis Gary Powers is sentenced to ten years imprisonment by the Soviet Union for espionage.
  1960   – Sputnik program: Korabl-Sputnik 2: The Soviet Union launches the satellite with the dogs Belka and Strelka, 40 mice, two rats and a variety of plants.
1964 – Syncom 3, the first geostationary communication satellite, is launched. Two months later, it would enable live coverage of the 1964 Summer Olympics.
1965 – Japanese prime minister Eisaku Satō becomes the first post-World War II sitting prime minister to visit Okinawa Prefecture.
1978 – In Iran, the Cinema Rex fire causes more than 400 deaths.
1980 – Saudia Flight 163, a Lockheed L-1011 TriStar burns after making an emergency landing at King Khalid International Airport in Riyadh, Saudi Arabia, killing 301 people.
  1980   – Otłoczyn railway accident: In Poland's worst post-war railway accident, 67 people lose their lives and a further 62 are injured.
1981 – Gulf of Sidra Incident: United States F-14A Tomcat fighters intercept and shoot down two Libyan Sukhoi Su-22 fighter jets over the Gulf of Sidra.
1987 – Hungerford massacre: In the United Kingdom, Michael Ryan kills sixteen people with a semi-automatic rifle and then commits suicide.
1989 – Polish president Wojciech Jaruzelski nominates Solidarity activist Tadeusz Mazowiecki to be the first non-communist prime minister in 42 years.
  1989   – Several hundred East Germans cross the frontier between Hungary and Austria during the Pan-European Picnic, part of the events that began the process of the Fall of the Berlin Wall.
1991 – Dissolution of the Soviet Union: The August Coup begins when Soviet President Mikhail Gorbachev is placed under house arrest while on holiday in the town of Foros, Ukraine.
  1991   – Crown Heights riot begins.
1999 – In Belgrade, Yugoslavia, tens of thousands of Serbians rally to demand the resignation of Federal Republic of Yugoslavia President Slobodan Milošević.
2002 – Khankala Mi-26 crash: A Russian Mil Mi-26 helicopter carrying troops is hit by a Chechen missile outside Grozny, killing 118 soldiers.
2003 – A truck-bomb attack on United Nations headquarters in Iraq kills the agency's top envoy Sérgio Vieira de Mello and 21 other employees.
  2003   – Shmuel HaNavi bus bombing: A suicide attack on a bus in Jerusalem, planned by Hamas, kills 23 Israelis, seven of them children.
2004 – Google Inc. has its initial public offering on Nasdaq.
2005 – The first-ever joint military exercise between Russia and China, called Peace Mission 2005 begins.
2009 – A series of bombings in Baghdad, Iraq, kills 101 and injures 565 others.
2010 – Operation Iraqi Freedom ends, with the last of the United States brigade combat teams crossing the border to Kuwait.
2013 – The Dhamara Ghat train accident kills at least 37 people in the Indian state of Bihar.
2017 – Tens of thousands of farmed non-native Atlantic salmon are accidentally released into the wild in Washington waters in the 2017 Cypress Island Atlantic salmon pen break.

Births

Pre-1600
 232 – Marcus Aurelius Probus, Roman emperor (d. 282)
1342 – Catherine of Bohemia, duchess of Austria (d. 1395)
1398 – Íñigo López de Mendoza, 1st Marquis of Santillana, Spanish poet and politician (d. 1458)
1570 – Salamone Rossi, Italian violinist and composer (probable; d. 1630)
1583 – Daišan, Chinese prince and statesman (d. 1648)
1590 – Henry Rich, 1st Earl of Holland, English soldier and politician, Lord Lieutenant of Berkshire (d. 1649)
1596 – Elizabeth Stuart, queen of Bohemia (d. 1662)

1601–1900
1609 – Jan Fyt, Flemish painter (d. 1661) 
1621 – Gerbrand van den Eeckhout, Dutch painter, etcher, and poet (d. 1674)
1631 – John Dryden, English poet, literary critic and playwright (d. 1700)
1646 – John Flamsteed, English astronomer and academic (d. 1719)
1686 – Eustace Budgell, English journalist and politician (d. 1737)
1689 (baptized) – Samuel Richardson, English author and publisher (d. 1761)
1711 – Edward Boscawen, English admiral and politician (d. 1761)
1719 – Charles-François de Broglie, marquis de Ruffec, French soldier and diplomat (d. 1781)
1743 – Madame du Barry, French mistress of Louis XV of France (d. 1793)
1777 – Francis I, king of the Two Sicilies (d. 1830)
1815 – Harriette Newell Woods Baker, American editor and children's book writer (d. 1893)
1819 – Julius van Zuylen van Nijevelt, Luxembourger-Dutch politician, Prime Minister of the Netherlands (d. 1894)
1830 – Julius Lothar Meyer, German chemist (d. 1895) 
1835 – Tom Wills, Australian cricketer and pioneer of Australian rules football (d. 1880)
1843 – C. I. Scofield, American minister and theologian (d. 1921)
1846 – Luis Martín, Spanish religious leader, 24th Superior General of the Society of Jesus (d. 1906)
1848 – Gustave Caillebotte, French painter and engineer (d. 1894)
1849 – Joaquim Nabuco, Brazilian politician and diplomat (d. 1910)
1858 – Ellen Willmott, English horticulturalist (d. 1934)
1870 – Bernard Baruch, American businessman and philanthropist (d. 1965)
1871 – Orville Wright, American engineer and pilot, co-founded the Wright Company (d. 1948)
1873 – Fred Stone, American actor and producer (d. 1959)
1878 – Manuel L. Quezon, Filipino soldier, lawyer, and politician, 2nd President of the Philippines (d. 1944)
1881 – George Enescu, Romanian violinist, pianist, composer, and conductor (d. 1955)
  1881   – George Shepherd, 1st Baron Shepherd (d. 1954)
1883 – Coco Chanel, French fashion designer, founded the Chanel Company (d. 1971)
  1883   – José Mendes Cabeçadas, Portuguese admiral and politician, 9th President of Portugal (d. 1965)
1885 – Grace Hutchins, American labor reformer and researcher (d. 1969)
1887 – S. Satyamurti, Indian lawyer and politician (d. 1943)
1895 – C. Suntharalingam, Sri Lankan lawyer, academic, and politician (d. 1985)
1899 – Colleen Moore, American actress (d. 1988)
1900 – Gontran de Poncins, French author and adventurer (d. 1962)
  1900   – Gilbert Ryle, English philosopher, author, and academic (d. 1976)
  1900   – Dorothy Burr Thompson, American archaeologist and art historian (d. 2001)

1901–present
1902 – Ogden Nash, American poet (d. 1971)
1903 – James Gould Cozzens, American novelist and short story writer (d. 1978)
1904 – Maurice Wilks, English engineer and businessman (d. 1963)
1906 – Philo Farnsworth, American inventor, invented the Fusor (d. 1971)
1907 – Hazari Prasad Dwivedi, Indian historian, author, and scholar (d. 1979)
1909 – Ronald King, New Zealand rugby player (d. 1988)
1910 – Saint Alphonsa,  first woman of Indian origin to be canonized as a saint by the Catholic Church (d. 1946)
1911 – Anna Terruwe, Dutch psychiatrist and author (d. 2004)
1912 – Herb Narvo, Australian rugby league player, coach, and boxer (d. 1958)
1913 – John Argyris, Greek engineer and academic (d. 2004)
  1913   – Peter Kemp, Indian-English soldier and author (d. 1993)
  1913   – Richard Simmons, American actor (d. 2003)
1914 – Lajos Baróti, Hungarian footballer and manager (d. 2005)
  1914   – Fumio Hayasaka, Japanese composer (d. 1955)
  1914   – Rose Heilbron, British barrister and judge (d. 2005)
1915 – Ring Lardner, Jr., American journalist and screenwriter (d. 2000)
  1915   – Alfred Rouleau, Canadian businessman (d. 1985)
1916 – Dennis Poore, English racing driver and businessman (d. 1987)
1918 – Jimmy Rowles, American singer-songwriter and pianist (d. 1996)
1919 – Malcolm Forbes, American publisher and politician (d. 1990)
1921 – Gene Roddenberry, American screenwriter and producer (d. 1991)
1922 – Jack Holland, Australian rugby league player (d. 1994)
1923 – Edgar F. Codd, English computer scientist, inventor of relational model of data (d. 2003)
1924 – Willard Boyle, Canadian physicist and academic, Nobel Prize laureate (d. 2011)
  1924   – William Marshall, American actor, director, and opera singer (d. 2003)
1925 – Claude Gauvreau, Canadian poet and playwright (d. 1971)
1926 – Angus Scrimm, American actor and author (d. 2016)
1928 – Shiv Prasaad Singh, Indian Hindi writer (d.1998)
  1928   – Bernard Levin, English journalist, author, and broadcaster (d. 2004)
1929 – Bill Foster, American basketball player and coach (d. 2016)
  1929   – Ion N. Petrovici, Romanian-German neurologist and academic (d. 2021)
1930 – Frank McCourt, American author and educator (d. 2009)
1931 – Bill Shoemaker, American jockey and author (d. 2003)
1932 – Thomas P. Salmon, American lawyer and politician, 75th Governor of Vermont
  1932   – Banharn Silpa-archa, Thai politician, Prime Minister (1995–1996) (d. 2016)
1933 – Bettina Cirone, American model and photographer
  1933   – David Hopwood, English microbiologist and geneticist
  1933   – Debra Paget, American actress 
1934 – David Durenberger, American soldier, lawyer, and politician (d. 2023)
  1934   – Renée Richards, American tennis player and ophthalmologist
1935 – Bobby Richardson, American baseball player and coach
1936 – Richard McBrien, American priest, theologian, and academic (d. 2015)
1937 – Richard Ingrams, English journalist, founded The Oldie
  1937   – William Motzing, American composer and conductor (d. 2014)
1938 – Diana Muldaur, American actress
  1938   – Nelly Vuksic, Argentine conductor and musician
1939 – Ginger Baker, English drummer and songwriter (d. 2019)
1940 – Roger Cook, English songwriter, singer, and producer
  1940   – Johnny Nash, American singer-songwriter (d. 2020)
  1940   – Jill St. John, American model and actress
1941 – John Cootes, Australian rugby league player, priest, and businessman
  1941   – Mihalis Papagiannakis, Greek educator and politician (d. 2009)
1942 – Fred Thompson, American actor, lawyer, and politician (d. 2015)
1943 – Don Fardon, English pop singer
  1943   – Sid Going, New Zealand rugby player
  1943   – Billy J. Kramer, English pop singer
1944 – Jack Canfield, American author
  1944   – Bodil Malmsten, Swedish author and poet (d. 2016)
  1944   – Eddy Raven, American country music singer-songwriter
  1944   – Charles Wang, Chinese-American businessman and philanthropist, co-founded Computer Associates International (d. 2018)
1945 – Dennis Eichhorn, American author and illustrator (d. 2015)
  1945   – Charles Wellesley, 9th Duke of Wellington, English politician
  1945   – Ian Gillan, English singer-songwriter
1946 – Charles Bolden, American general and astronaut
  1946   – Bill Clinton, American lawyer and politician, 42nd President of the United States
  1946   – Dawn Steel, American film producer (d. 1997)
1947 – Dave Dutton, English actor and screenwriter
  1947   – Terry Hoeppner, American football player and coach (d. 2007)
  1947   – Gerard Schwarz, American conductor and director
  1947   – Anuška Ferligoj, Slovenian mathematician
1948 – Robert Hughes, Australian actor
  1948   – Christy O'Connor Jnr, Irish golfer and architect (d. 2016)
1949 – Michael Nazir-Ali, Pakistani-English bishop
1950 – Jennie Bond, English journalist and author
  1950   – Sudha Murty, Indian author and teacher, head of Infosys Foundation
1951 – John Deacon, English bass player and songwriter
  1951   – Gustavo Santaolalla, Argentinian singer-songwriter, guitarist, and producer 
1952 – Jonathan Frakes, American actor and director
1954 – Oscar Larrauri, Argentinian racing driver
1955 – Mary-Anne Fahey, Australian actress
  1955   – Peter Gallagher, American actor
  1955   – Patricia Scotland, Baroness Scotland of Asthal, Dominica-born English lawyer and politician, Attorney General for England and Wales
  1955   – Ned Yost, American baseball player and manager
1956 – Adam Arkin, American actor, director, and producer
  1956   – José Rubén Zamora, Guatemalan journalist
1957 – Paul-Jan Bakker, Dutch cricketer
  1957   – Gary Chapman, American singer-songwriter and guitarist 
  1957   – Martin Donovan, American actor and director
  1957   – Ian Gould, English cricketer and umpire
  1957   – Cesare Prandelli, Italian footballer and manager
  1957   – Christine Soetewey, Belgian high jumper
  1957   – Gerda Verburg, Dutch trade union leader and politician, Dutch Minister of Agriculture
1958 – Gary Gaetti, American baseball player, coach, and manager
  1958   – Anthony Muñoz, American football player and sportscaster
  1958   – Brendan Nelson, Australian physician and politician, 47th Minister for Defence for Australia
  1958   – Rick Snyder, American politician and businessman, 48th Governor of Michigan
1959 – Chris Mortimer, Australian rugby league player
  1959   – Ricky Pierce, American basketball player
1960 – Morten Andersen, Danish-American football player
1961 – Jonathan Coe, English author and academic
1963 – John Stamos, American actor
1965 – Kevin Dillon, American actor  
  1965   – Kyra Sedgwick, American actress and producer
  1965   – James Tomkins, Australian rower 
1966 – Lee Ann Womack, American singer-songwriter
1967 – Khandro Rinpoche, Indian spiritual leader
  1967   – Satya Nadella, Indian-American business executive, Chairman and CEO of Microsoft
  1969   – Douglas Allen Tunstall Jr., American professional wrestler and politician 
1969 – Nate Dogg, American rapper (d. 2011)
  1969   – Matthew Perry, American actor, producer, and screenwriter
  1969   – Kazuyoshi Tatsunami, Japanese baseball player and coach
  1969   – Clay Walker, American singer-songwriter and guitarist
1971 – Mary Joe Fernández, Dominican-American tennis player and coach
  1971   – João Vieira Pinto, Portuguese footballer
1972 – Roberto Abbondanzieri, Argentinian footballer and manager
  1972   – Chihiro Yonekura, Japanese singer-songwriter
1973 – Marco Materazzi, Italian footballer and manager
  1973   – Tasma Walton, Australian actress
1976 – Régine Chassagne, Canadian singer-songwriter 
1977 – Iban Mayo, Spanish cyclist
1978 – Chris Capuano, American baseball player
1979 – Oumar Kondé, Swiss footballer
1980 – Darius Campbell, Scottish singer-songwriter, guitarist, and actor (d. 2022)
  1980   – Craig Frawley, Australian rugby league player
  1980   – Jun Jin, South Korean singer 
  1980   – Paul Parry, Welsh footballer
  1980   – Michael Todd, American bass player 
1981 – Nick Kennedy, English rugby player
  1981   – Percy Watson, American football player and wrestler
1982 – J. J. Hardy, American baseball player
  1982   – Kevin Rans, Belgian pole vaulter
  1982   – Stipe Miocic, American professional mixed martial artist
1983 – Mike Conway, English racing driver
  1983   – Missy Higgins, Australian singer-songwriter
1984 – Simon Bird, English actor and screenwriter
  1984   – Alessandro Matri, Italian footballer
  1984   – Ryan Taylor, English footballer
1985 – David A. Gregory, American actor
  1985   – Lindsey Jacobellis, American snowboarder
1986 – Sotiris Balafas, Greek footballer
  1986   – Saori Kimura, Japanese volleyball player
  1986   – Christina Perri, American singer and songwriter
1987 – Nick Driebergen, Dutch swimmer
  1987   – Nico Hülkenberg, German racing driver
1988 – Veronica Roth, American author
  1989   – Romeo Miller, American basketball player, rapper, actor
1990 – Danny Galbraith, Scottish footballer
1991 – Salem Al-Dawsari, Saudi Arabian footballer
1994 – Nafissatou Thiam, Belgian pentathlete and heptathlete
  1994   – Fernando Gaviria, Colombian cyclist
  1996 – Jung Ye-rin, South Korean singer and actress
1996   – Lachlan Lewis, Australian rugby league player
1999 – Thomas Flegler, Australian rugby league player
2001 – Awak Kuier, Finnish basketball player

Deaths

Pre-1600
 607 BC – Duke Ling of Jin, Chinese monarch
AD 14 – Augustus, Roman emperor (b. 63 BC)
 780 – Credan, English abbot and saint
 947 – Abu Yazid, Kharijite rebel leader (b. 873)
 998 – Fujiwara no Sukemasa, Japanese noble, statesman and calligrapher (b. 944)
1072 – Hawise, Duchess of Brittany  (b. 1037)
1085 – Al-Juwayni, Muslim scholar and imam (b. 1028)
1186 – Geoffrey II, Duke of Brittany (b. 1158)
1245 – Ramon Berenguer IV, Count of Provence (b. 1195)
1284 – Alphonso, Earl of Chester (b. 1273)
1297 – Louis of Toulouse, French bishop and saint (b. 1274)
1457 – Andrea del Castagno, Italian painter (b. 1421)
1470 – Richard Olivier de Longueil, French cardinal (b. 1406)
1493 – Frederick III, Holy Roman Emperor (b. 1415)
1506 – King Alexander Jagiellon of Poland (b. 1461)
1541 – Vincenzo Cappello, Venetian admiral and statesman (b. 1469)
1580 – Andrea Palladio, Italian architect, designed the Church of San Giorgio Maggiore and Il Redentore (b. 1508)

1601–1900
1646 – Alexander Henderson, Scottish theologian and academic (b. 1583)
1654 – Yom-Tov Lipmann Heller, Bohemian rabbi (b. 1579)
1662 – Blaise Pascal, French mathematician, physicist, and philosopher (b. 1623)
1680 – Jean Eudes, French priest, founded the Congregation of Jesus and Mary (b. 1601)
1691 – Köprülü Fazıl Mustafa Pasha, Ottoman commander and politician, 117th Grand Vizier of the Ottoman Empire (b. 1637)
1702 – Anthony Grey, 11th Earl of Kent, English politician (b. 1645)
1753 – Johann Balthasar Neumann, German engineer and architect, designed Basilica of the Fourteen Holy Helpers (b. 1687)
1808 – Fredrik Henrik af Chapman, Swedish admiral and shipbuilder (b. 1721)
1822 – Jean Baptiste Joseph Delambre, French mathematician and astronomer (b. 1749)
1883 – Jeremiah S. Black, American lawyer and politician, 24th United States Attorney General (b. 1810)
1889 – Auguste Villiers de l'Isle-Adam, French author, poet, and playwright (b. 1838)
1895 – John Wesley Hardin, American Old West outlaw, gunfighter (b. 1853)
1900 – Jean-Baptiste Accolay, Belgian violinist, composer, and conductor (b. 1833)

1901–present
1914 – Franz Xavier Wernz, German religious leader, 25th Superior General of the Society of Jesus (b. 1844)
1915 – Tevfik Fikret, Turkish poet and educator (b. 1867)
1923 – Vilfredo Pareto, Italian sociologist and economist (b. 1845)
1928 – Stephanos Skouloudis, Greek banker and diplomat, 97th Prime Minister of Greece (b. 1838)
1929 – Sergei Diaghilev, Russian critic and producer, founded Ballets Russes (b. 1872)
1932 – Louis Anquetin, French painter (b. 1861)
1936 – Federico García Lorca, Spanish poet, playwright, and director (b. 1898)
1942 – Harald Kaarmann, Estonian footballer (b. 1901)
  1942   – Heinrich Rauchinger, Kraków-born painter (b. 1858)
1945 – Tomás Burgos, Chilean philanthropist (b. 1875)
1950 – Giovanni Giorgi, Italian physicist and engineer (b. 1871)
1954 – Alcide De Gasperi, Italian journalist and politician, 30th Prime Minister of Italy (b. 1881)
1957 – David Bomberg, English soldier and painter (b. 1890)
1967 – Hugo Gernsback, Luxembourg-born American author and publisher (b. 1884)
  1967   – Isaac Deutscher, Polish-English journalist and historian (b. 1907)
1968 – George Gamow, Ukrainian-American physicist and cosmologist (b. 1904)
1970 – Paweł Jasienica, Polish soldier and historian (b. 1909)
1975 – Mark Donohue, American race car driver and engineer (b. 1937)
1976 – Alastair Sim, Scottish-English actor (b. 1900)
  1976   – Ken Wadsworth, New Zealand cricketer (b. 1946)
1977 – Aleksander Kreek, Estonian shot putter and discus thrower (b. 1914)
  1977   – Groucho Marx, American comedian and actor (b. 1890)
1980 – Otto Frank, German-Swiss businessman, father of Anne Frank (b. 1889)
1981 – Jessie Matthews, English actress, singer, and dancer (b. 1907)
1982 – August Neo, Estonian wrestler (b. 1908)
1986 – Hermione Baddeley, English actress (b. 1906)
  1986   – Viv Thicknesse, Australian rugby player (b. 1910)
1993 – Utpal Dutt, Bangladeshi actor, director, and playwright (b. 1929)
1994 – Linus Pauling, American chemist and biologist, Nobel Prize laureate (b. 1901)
1995 – Pierre Schaeffer, French composer and musicologist (b. 1910)
2000 – Bineshwar Brahma, Indian poet, author, and educator (b. 1948)
2001 – Donald Woods, South African journalist and activist (b. 1933)
2003 – Carlos Roberto Reina, Honduran lawyer and politician, President of Honduras (b. 1926)
  2003   – Sérgio Vieira de Mello, Brazilian diplomat (b. 1948)
2005 – Mo Mowlam, English academic and politician, Chancellor of the Duchy of Lancaster (b. 1949)
2008 – Levy Mwanawasa, Zambian lawyer and politician, 3rd President of Zambia (b. 1948)
2009 – Don Hewitt, American television producer, created 60 Minutes (b. 1922)
2011 – Raúl Ruiz, Chilean director and producer (b. 1941)
2012 – Donal Henahan, American journalist and critic (b. 1921)
  2012   – Ivar Iversen, Norwegian canoe racer (b. 1914)
  2012   – Tony Scott, English-American director and producer (b. 1944)
  2012   – Edmund Skellings, American poet and academic (b. 1932)
2013 – Musa'id bin Abdulaziz Al Saud, Saudi Arabian prince (b. 1923)
  2013   – Russell S. Doughten, American director and producer (b. 1927)
  2013   – Abdul Rahim Hatif, Afghan politician, 8th President of Afghanistan (b. 1926)
  2013   – Donna Hightower, American singer-songwriter (b. 1926)
2014 – Samih al-Qasim, Palestinian poet and journalist (b. 1939)
  2014   – Simin Behbahani, Iranian poet and activist (b. 1927)
  2014   – James Foley, American photographer and journalist (b. 1973)
  2014   – Candida Lycett Green, Anglo-Irish journalist and author (b. 1942)
2015 – George Houser, American minister and activist (b. 1916)
  2015   – Sanat Mehta, Indian activist and politician (b. 1935)
2016 – Jack Riley, American actor and voice artist (b. 1935)
2017 – Dick Gregory, American comedian, author and activist (b. 1932)
2019 – Lars Larsen, Danish businessman and billionaire, founder and owner of the Danish retail chain JYSK (b. 1948)
2021 – Sonny Chiba, Japanese actor (b. 1939)

Holidays and observances
Afghan Independence Day, commemorates the Treaty of Rawalpindi in 1919, granting independence from Britain (Afghanistan)
August Revolution Commemoration Day (Vietnam)
Birthday of Crown Princess Mette-Marit (Norway)
Christian Feast Day:
Bernardo Tolomei
Bertulf of Bobbio
Saint Calminius
Ezequiél Moreno y Díaz
Feast of the Transfiguration (Julian calendar), and its related observances:
Buhe (Ethiopian Orthodox Tewahedo Church and Eritrean Orthodox Tewahedo Church)
Saviour's Transfiguration, popularly known as the "Apples Feast" (Russian Orthodox Church and Georgian Orthodox Church)
Jean-Eudes de Mézeray
Louis of Toulouse
Maginus
Magnus of Anagni
Magnus of Avignon
Sebaldus
August 19 (Eastern Orthodox liturgics)
Manuel Luis Quezón Day (Quezon City and other places in the Philippines named after Manuel L. Quezon)
National Aviation Day (United States)
World Humanitarian Day

References

External links

 
 
 

Days of the year
August